Face of the Earth may refer to:

 "The Face of the Earth", translation of Das Antlitz der Erde, a geologic work by Eduard Suess
 "Face of the Earth", a song by Days of the New from Days of the New (the Orange album)
 "Face of the Earth", a song by tobyMac from Portable Sounds
 "The Face of the Earth", a song by The Dismemberment Plan from Change